The Los Hidalgos Formation is a geologic formation in Jamaica. It preserves fossils dating back to the Paleogene period.

See also

 List of fossiliferous stratigraphic units in Jamaica

References
 

Paleogene Jamaica